Hesseng is a village in Sør-Varanger Municipality in Troms og Finnmark county, Norway. The village of Hesseng lies at the intersection of the European route E105 and European route E6 highways. The other suburbs of Sandnes and Bjørnevatn lie just to the south of Hesseng.

References

Sør-Varanger
Villages in Finnmark
Populated places of Arctic Norway